The 2017 Czech Republic motorcycle Grand Prix was the tenth round of the 2017 MotoGP season. It was held at the Masaryk Circuit in Brno on  August 6, 2017.

Classification

MotoGP

Moto2
The race, scheduled to be run for 20 laps, was red-flagged on lap 8 due to changing track conditions. The race was later restarted over 6 laps.

Moto3

Championship standings after the race

MotoGP
Below are the standings for the top five riders and constructors after round ten has concluded.

Riders' Championship standings

Constructors' Championship standings

 Note: Only the top five positions are included for both sets of standings.

Moto2

Moto3

Notes

References

Czech
Motorcycle Grand Prix
Czech Republic motorcycle Grand Prix
Czech